The Forney Transportation Museum is a transportation museum located in Denver, Colorado.

It is named after the founder, J.D. Forney, who started Forney Industries, Inc., in Fort Collins.

Collection
The museum maintains a collection of approximately 500 exhibits.  Its early years were focused on antique automobiles but the focus soon expanded to other modes of transport.  The museum has a slogan, "Anything on Wheels," and includes the following items:

 Amelia Earhart's "Gold Bug" Kissel.
 Big Boy locomotive #4005.
 A Forney locomotive; locomotive designer Matthias N. Forney was a second cousin to the museum founder, J.D. Forney.

History 

The Forney Museum of Transportation began as a private collection and has expanded into one of the finest transportation collections in the country.  Mr. J.D. Forney, founder of Forney Industries in Ft. Collins, Colorado, became interested in antique and classic cars after his wife and children gave him a 1921 Kissel yellow Tourister, the same model he used to court his wife Rae.

Forney Industries has produced many products such as the Fornair airplane, a central vacuum system and portable vacuum cleaner, auto generators, and battery chargers, but the best-known products are the different models of electric welders and welding supplies.

Mr. Forney started taking in old cars and carriages as trades on some of the welder sales.  In 1961 the Forney Museum incorporated in Fort Collins, Colorado.  In 1964 it became recognized as a 501(c)(3) non-profit organization.

Locomotives 

The Big Boy Union Pacific #4005 is one of the few remaining examples of the world's largest steam locomotives, a 4-8-8-4 type  Only 25 were ever built, and eight remain in museums.  The #4005 was briefly converted to oil fuel from 1946 to 1948, and was also involved in a crash on April 27, 1953.

The Forney locomotive 0-4-4T was designed and patented by Matthias Forney, and this "Forney" tank-type of engine was built by several manufacturers.  The one displayed at the Forney Museum of Transportation was built by Porter in Pittsburgh, Pennsylvania, in 1897. This type of engine was commonly used on elevated railways, such as the New York Elevated Railway, the Brooklyn Elevated, and the Chicago Elevated.  They were called the "Little Giants," and more than 500 were in service around 1900 hauling both freight and passengers. Steam-powered engines on the elevateds lasted only a few years, as they were replaced by the new electric engines.  Forney engines were then sold off to buyers all over the world for mining, lumber, plantations, and short-haul freight and passengers. The Forney locomotives hauled both freight and passengers in the Denver area.  The Denver, Lakewood and Golden Railway and the Denver Circle Railroad were the best known systems using this model.

Visiting 

The museum is located in Denver, Colorado. The facility has  open to the public and another  available for future expansion.

References

External links

Museums in Denver
Railroad museums in Colorado
Automobile museums in Colorado
Museums established in 1961
1961 establishments in Colorado